The Bécancour River is a river flowing in the administrative region of Centre-du-Québec, in Quebec, Canada.

Geography 

The Bécancour takes its source from the lake of the same name in the town of Thetford Mines, in the Chaudière-Appalaches region. It flows west into William Lake at Saint-Ferdinand, changes course northwards towards Inverness, turning westward there and continuing to flow west across the Centre-du-Québec region for most of its length. The river takes a turn northwestward at Saint-Wenceslas, finally emptying into the Saint Lawrence River near the heart of the city of Bécancour.

Course 
It has its source in Bécancour Lake, in the town of Thetford Mines. It follows a winding route to Lyster, which marks its entry into the St. Lawrence Lowlands. It then turns west-southwest to Daveluyville where it turns north-west to Bécancour where it flows into the estuary of Saint Lawrence.

Major tributaries
 Rivière au Pin
 Palmer River
 Noire River
 Bourbon River
 Blanche River (Saint-Rosaire) 
 Blanche River (Thetford Mines)

Hydrology 

Its modulus, which is measured at Maddington and comprises 84% of the basin, is 59 m3/s. Its average flood is 200 m3/s and its low water discharge is 25 m3/s. As for the extreme values recorded, they range from 1 to 500 m3/s. This input, however, has a negligible effect on the river flow and represents less than 0.05 m3/s at Maddington.

The river receives input from 87 watercourses. Its main tributaries are, from upstream to downstream, the rivière au Pin, the Bullard stream, the Palmer River (Bécancour River tributary), the Noire River, the Bourbon River the Blanche River at Saint-Rosaire and another Blanche river at Saint-Wenceslas.

In addition to Bécancour Lake, the river crosses Stater pond and lakes à la Truite, William Lake (the largest in the basin) and Joseph. As for wetlands, they cover , or 5.9% of the.

Population 
The territory of the basin is divided into 45 municipalitys and one Indian reserve. The largest municipality in the basin, Thetford Mines (26,190 inhabitants), has 41% of the population of this basin. Two other towns over 5000 inhabitants are Princeville and Plessisville.

Geology 
Bécancour is part of two geological provinces, namely the Appalachians upstream and the St. Lawrence Lowlands downstream. The Appalachians are composed of sedimentary rocks and volcanic which have been deposited in a deep marine environment. They were raised during the Taconic orogeny. As for the St. Lawrence platform, it is composed of limestone, sandstone and mudrock undeformed;.

Natural environment 
The basin includes 378 plant species. In the plain downstream of the basin, the main forest species are gray birch, trembling aspen, white spruce and balsam fir. Peatlands encourage black spruce and tamarack. The Appalachian sector is dominated by maple grove to yellow birch and maple grove to beech. The top of the mountains near Thetford Mines are favorable to white birch while at the bottom of the slopes we find balsam fir and tamarack.

We find 66 species of fish in the Bécancour basin. The main species of interest for sport fishing are brook trout, brown trout, rainbow trout, Atlantic salmon, lake trout, northern pike, muskellunge, brown bullhead, rock bass, pumpkinseed, smallmouth bass, largemouth bass, perch and walleye.

Toponymy 

In the 17th century, the river was originally known by European sattlers as the "Stinking River". Around 1600, some Abenaki families established themselves on the Puante River. The use continued during the first half of the 18th century. A map of the Province of Quebec from 1776 shows a "Gt. Puante River" and a "L. Puante River" north of it. A map of Canada from 1812 shows the Grand Puant River with the town of Bequencourt at its mouth and a smaller Puant River farther north.

The Abenaki name it Wôlinaktekw which means "river at the bay". The Scottish who settled in Inverness named the section that passes through their territory "Thames River" (the Thames).

The present-day name of the river commemorates Pierre Robineau de Bécancour, 2e baron de Portneuf, lord of Bécancour (1654-1729). This name appeared on the 1695 map of Jean Deshayes. This name replaced the original names of Puante rivers (where the battle of the Puante River took place), and Saint-Michel.

The toponym Rivière Bécancour was formalized on December 5, 1968, at the Commission de toponymie du Québec.

History 
It was around 1600 that the Abenakis settled at the mouth of the Wôlinaktekw. Most of the natives who settled there came from Namesokântsik (a place where there are many fish), now known as Mégantic, and from the Abenakis from the region of the river Kennebec which circulated by Lake Mégantic. After several trips, they settled permanently in Wôlinak in 1735. The “Piste Bécancour” (Abenaki Becancour Trail), linked the Grand lac Saint François, via the Petit lac Saint-François (Ashberham), in the canton of Coleraine, to the basin of the Bécancour River to Wôlinak. A village named "Wananoak" located near the sources of the river and a path leading to Lac Mégantic is inscribed on a Mitchell Map of 1755. The village is also described : Indian village of New France or Canada located near the shore and the source of the Puante river. As for the French, they began to settle in the plain of Bécancour in 1676. The Appalachian region was colonized by the British in the early 1800s. They were replaced by the French Canadians and the Irish around the middle of the 19th century.

However, the Appalachian region was transformed as early as 1876 with the discovery of asbestos. It was in 1905 that Thetford Mines, the most important city in the basin, was founded.

Image gallery

See also
Bécancour Regional County Municipality (MRC)
List of rivers of Quebec

References

Bibliography

External links 
 

Rivers of Chaudière-Appalaches
Rivers of Centre-du-Québec